Șuluțiu is a Romanian surname. Notable people with the surname include:

Octav Șuluțiu (1909–1949), Romanian prose writer and literary critic

See also
Sterca-Șuluțiu, two ethnic Romanian Transylvanian brothers

Romanian-language surnames